The 1997 Purdue Boilermakers football team represented Purdue University in the 1997 NCAA Division I-A football season. They played their home games at Ross–Ade Stadium in West Lafayette, Indiana and were members of the Big Ten Conference. Purdue had its best season since 1980 under new head coach Joe Tiller.

Schedule

Personnel

Coaching staff
 Head coach: Joe Tiller
 Assistants: Tim Burke, Jim Chaney, Scott Downing, Gary Emanuel, Danny Hope, Larry Korpitz, Tim Lappano, Randy Melvin, Greg Olson, Brock Spack

Starters
Offense: WR Brian Alford, WR Gabe Cox, LT Mark Fischer, WR F Chesti, LG Brian Nicely, C Jim Niedrach, RG Chukky Okobi, RT Dan Maly, TE Jon Blackman, WR Isaac Jones, QB Billy Dicken, RB Edwin Watson, K Shane Ryan
Defense: LE Chukie Nwokorie, LT Leo Perez, RT Greg Smith, RE Rosevelt Colvin, WLB Willie Burroughs, MLB Willie Fells, SLB Mike Rose, LCB Michael Hawthorne, FS Adrian Beasley, SS Lee Brush, RCB Lamar Conrad, P Brandon Kaser

Game summaries

Toledo

    
    
    
    
    
    
    
    
    
    

Joe Tiller's first game as Purdue head coach

Notre Dame

    
    
    
    
    
    
    

In Joe Tiller's first home game, Purdue snapped an 11-game losing streak to Notre Dame as fans tore down the goalposts after the victory. Edwin Watson, who had two touchdown runs, had said earlier in the week that former head coach and new Irish offensive coordinator Jim Colletto "was used to losing here (Purdue), so it would be nothing new for him."

Ball State

Northwestern

Kendall Matthews 29 rushes, 152 yards

Minnesota

    
    
    
    
    
    
    
    
    
    
    
    
    
    
    

Purdue's first win in Minneapolis since 1983.

Wisconsin

With the win over Wisconsin, Purdue is off to its best start since 1978 and produced their first five-game winning streak since 1980.

Illinois

Kendall Matthews 16 rushes, 177 yards

Iowa

Michigan State

Edwin Watson 24 rushes, 115 yards

Penn State

Edwin Watson 19 rushes, 133 yards

Indiana

    
    
    
    
    
    
    
    
    

Edwin Watson 18 rushes, 163 yards

Oklahoma State

Roster

Awards
 All-Americans: Brian Alford (Football News)
 All-Big Ten: Brian Alford (1st), Rosevelt Colvin (2nd), Billy Dicken (1st)

References

Purdue
Purdue Boilermakers football seasons
Alamo Bowl champion seasons
Purdue Boilermakers football